Galya pudla is a Gujarati food item made of jaggery and wheat flour.

To create galya pudla, jaggery is mix in hot water for melting. After the jaggery melts, the wheat flour is mixed with it, and the resulting caramel is spread on tava. It is streamed with ghee on two sides.

See also 
 Gujarati cuisine

References
 http://www.deshgujarat.com/gujarati-recipes-explained-in-gujarati-a-complete-database/
 http://www.tarladalal.com
 http://www.gurjari.com

Indian desserts
Gujarati cuisine